No. 177 Squadron RAF was a Royal Air Force Squadron that was a light bomber unit based in India in World War II.

History

Formation in World War II
The squadron was formed at RAF Amarda Road and Allahabad India on 14 January 1943.  It was equipped with Beaufighters and began operations against the Japanese in September 1943. The squadron converted to rocket armament for operations in Burma and disbanded on 1 July 1945.

Aircraft operated

References

External links
 History of No.'s 176–180 Squadrons at RAF Web
 177 Squadron history on the official RAF website

177
Military units and formations established in 1943